The following is a list of RiffTrax, downloadable audio commentaries featuring comedian Michael J. Nelson and others heckling (or riffing on) films in the style of Mystery Science Theater 3000, a TV show of which Nelson was the head writer and later the host. The RiffTrax are sold online as downloadable audio commentaries and pre-synchronized videos.

The site was launched by Nelson and Legend Films in 2006 and is based in San Diego.

Official RiffTrax

Commentaries
The following is a list of films for which Michael J. Nelson and guest riffers have provided audio commentary, in order of the release date, for RiffTrax.

RiffTrax Presents
These are RiffTrax in which Michael J. Nelson does not appear.

Public-domain shorts
These short films are presented as pre-synchronized video files, as opposed to audio files that users must synchronize themselves.

Original content shorts
These short films are original RiffTrax content, presented as pre-synchronized video files.

Full-length VOD films
These movies are presented as pre-synchronized video files, as opposed to audio files that users must synchronize themselves.

Note: The seven original Mike solo VODs were also released on dual-audio (Riffed and UnRiffed) DVD by Legend Films. Missile to the Moon was also released, but does not contain the Mike & Fred Willard riff.

RiffTrax DVDs and Blu-rays
These are RiffTrax featuring Mike, Kevin, and Bill on a DVD or Blu-ray with the original film.

{|class="wikitable sortable"
|-
!Movie
!Riffer(s)
!RiffTrax released
!Original release
|-
|Reefer Madness
|Michael J. Nelson
|2004-04-20April 20, 2004
|1936
|-
|Night of the Living Dead
|Michael J. Nelson
|2004-09-07September 7, 2004
|1968
|-
|Carnival of Souls
|Michael J. Nelson
|2005-03-29March 29, 2005
|1962
|-
|The Three Stooges in Color
|Film hosted by Michael J. Nelson, Kevin Murphy, and Bill Corbett
|2005-04-26April 26, 2005
|Various
|-
|House on Haunted Hill
|Michael J. Nelson
|2005-09-06September 6, 2005
|1959
|-
|Plan 9 from Outer Space
|Michael J. Nelson
|2006-07-04July 4, 2006
|1959
|-
|The Little Shop of Horrors
|Michael J. Nelson
|2006-07-04July 4, 2006
|1960
|-
||Swing Parade
|Michael J. Nelson
|2007-03-27March 27, 2007
|1946
|-
|The Three Stooges' Greatest Routines
|Film hosted by Michael J. Nelson and Kevin Murphy
|2007-03-27March 27, 2007
|Various
|-
|Missile to the Moon
|Film only
|2007-07-17July 17, 2007
|1958
|-
|Forbidden Zone
|Film only
|2008-07-15July 15, 2008
|1982
|-
|Lady Frankenstein
| Incognito Cinema Warriors XP
|2008-08-12August 12, 2008
|1971
|-
|RiffTrax Shorts Best Of: Volume 1
|Michael J. Nelson, Kevin Murphy, and Bill Corbett
|2008-11-17November 17, 2008
|Various
|-
|RiffTrax Shorts Best Of: Volume 2
|Michael J. Nelson, Kevin Murphy, and Bill Corbett
|2009-06-16June 16, 2009
|Various
|-
|Little Shop of Horrors (Three Riffer Edition)
|Michael J. Nelson, Kevin Murphy, and Bill Corbett
|2009-06-16April 4, 2009
|1960
|-
|Night of the Living Dead (Three Riffer Edition)
|Michael J. Nelson, Kevin Murphy, and Bill Corbett
|2009-06-16April 4, 2009
|1968
|-
|Reefer Madness (Three Riffer Edition)
|Michael J. Nelson, Kevin Murphy, and Bill Corbett
|2009-06-16April 4, 2009
|1936
|-
|Carnival of Souls (Three Riffer Edition)
|Michael J. Nelson, Kevin Murphy, and Bill Corbett
|2009-06-16June 16, 2009
|1962
|-
|House on Haunted Hill (Three Riffer Edition)
|Michael J. Nelson, Kevin Murphy, and Bill Corbett
|2009-06-16June 16, 2009
|1959
|-
|Missile to the Moon (Three Riffer Edition)
|Michael J. Nelson, Kevin Murphy, and Bill Corbett
|2009-06-16June 16, 2009
|1958
|-
|Plan 9 from Outer Space (Three Riffer Edition)
|Michael J. Nelson, Kevin Murphy, and Bill Corbett
|2009-06-16June 16, 2009
|1959
|-
|Swing Parade (Three Riffer Edition)
|Michael J. Nelson, Kevin Murphy, and Bill Corbett
|2009-06-16June 16, 2009
|1946
|-
|Rifftrax Live!: Plan 9 from Outer Space
|Michael J. Nelson, Kevin Murphy, and Bill Corbett with guest Jonathan Coulton and host Veronica Belmont
|2009-06-16December 10, 2009 (Note: Blu-ray December 15, 2011)
|1959
|-
|Shorts-Tacular Shorts-Stravaganza
|Michael J. Nelson, Kevin Murphy, and Bill Corbett
|2010-03-02March 2, 2010
|Various
|-
|Wide World of Shorts
|Michael J. Nelson, Kevin Murphy, and Bill Corbett
|2010-03-02March 2, 2010
|Various
|-
|Planet of Dinosaurs
|Michael J. Nelson, Kevin Murphy, and Bill Corbett
|2010-03-02March 2, 2010
|1978
|-
|Voodoo Man
|Michael J. Nelson, Kevin Murphy, and Bill Corbett
|2010-03-02March 2, 2010
|1944
|-
|RiffTrax Live: Christmas Shorts-stravaganza!
|Michael J. Nelson, Kevin Murphy, and Bill Corbett with guest riffer 'Weird Al' Yankovic
|2010-03-02March 17, 2010 (Note: Blu-ray January 12, 2012)
|Various
|-
|RiffTrax Plays with Their Shorts
|Michael J. Nelson, Kevin Murphy, and Bill Corbett
|2010-03-02May 25, 2010
|Various
|-
|Shorts-a-Poppin'''
|Michael J. Nelson, Kevin Murphy, and Bill Corbett
|2010-03-02May 25, 2010
|Various
|-
|Maniac|Michael J. Nelson, Kevin Murphy, and Bill Corbett
|2010-11-24November 24, 2010
|1934
|-
|Order in the Shorts|Michael J. Nelson, Kevin Murphy, and Bill Corbett (American Thrift co-riffed by Veronica Belmont)
|2011-01-25January 25, 2011
|Various
|-
|Shortstoberfest|Michael J. Nelson, Kevin Murphy, and Bill Corbett
|2011-01-25January 25, 2011
|Various
|-
|Santa and the Ice Cream Bunny|Michael J. Nelson, Kevin Murphy, and Bill Corbett
|2011-03-08March 8, 2011
|1972
|-
|RiffTrax: LIVE! Reefer Madness|Michael J. Nelson, Kevin Murphy, and Bill Corbett
|2011-01-25May 17, 2011 (Note: Blu-ray July 19)
|1936
|-
|RiffTrax: LIVE! House on Haunted Hill|Michael J. Nelson, Kevin Murphy, and Bill Corbett with guest riffer Paul F. Tompkins
|2011-01-25May 17, 2011 (Note: Blu-ray July 19)
|1959
|-
|Olde Tyme Shorts Roundup|Michael J. Nelson, Kevin Murphy, and Bill Corbett
|2011-07-19July 19, 2011
|Various
|-
|Shorts To-Go|Michael J. Nelson, Kevin Murphy, and Bill Corbett
|2011-07-19July 19, 2011
|Various
|-
|The Crater Lake Monster|Michael J. Nelson, Kevin Murphy, and Bill Corbett
|2012-03-06March 6, 2012
|1977
|-
|The Galaxy Invader|Michael J. Nelson, Kevin Murphy, and Bill Corbett
|2012-03-06March 6, 2012
|1985
|-
|Hand-crafted Artisanal Shorts|Michael J. Nelson, Kevin Murphy, and Bill Corbett
|2012-03-27March 27, 2012
|Various
|-
|RiffTrax Live: Jack the Giant Killer|Michael J. Nelson, Kevin Murphy, and Bill Corbett
|2012-05-01May 1, 2012
|1962
|-
|Christmas with Rifftrax, ft. The Shanty Where Santa Claus Lives and Magic Christmas Tree|Michael J. Nelson, Kevin Murphy, and Bill Corbett
|2012-11-15November 15, 2012
|1933/1964
|-
|Shorts to Astonish!|Michael J. Nelson, Kevin Murphy, and Bill Corbett (bonus shorts riffed by Cole Stratton and Janet Varney)
|2012-12-05December 5, 2012
|Various
|-
|Rifftrax Live: Birdemic: Shock and Terror|Michael J. Nelson, Kevin Murphy, and Bill Corbett
|2013-01-31January 31, 2013
|2008
|-
|May the Shorts Be With You|Michael J. Nelson, Kevin Murphy, and Bill Corbett 
|2013-11-21October 21, 2013
|Various
|-
|Ghosthouse|Michael J. Nelson, Kevin Murphy, and Bill Corbett
|2012-01-17November 14, 2013
|1988
|-
|Christmas with Rifftrax: Santa's Village of Madness(Santa's Enchanted Village/Santa Claus and His Helpers/Santa's Magic Kingdom)
|Michael J. Nelson, Kevin Murphy, and Bill Corbett
|2012-12-21November 25, 2013
|1964/1966
|-
|The Guy from Harlem|Michael J. Nelson, Kevin Murphy, and Bill Corbett
|2014-04-15April 15, 2014
|1977
|-
|RiffTrax Live: Manos: The Hands of Fate|Michael J. Nelson, Kevin Murphy, and Bill Corbett
|2014-05-06May 6, 2014
|1966
|-
|Shorts Assemble!|Michael J. Nelson, Kevin Murphy, and Bill Corbett 
|2015-06-23June 23, 2015
|Various
|-
|The Incredible 2-Headed Transplant|Michael J. Nelson, Kevin Murphy, and Bill Corbett
|2015-11-24November 24, 2015
|1971
|-
|RiffTrax Live: Santa Claus|Michael J. Nelson, Kevin Murphy, and Bill Corbett
|2015-11-24November 24, 2015
|1959
|-
|RiffTrax Live: Santa Claus Conquers the Martians|Michael J. Nelson, Kevin Murphy, and Bill Corbett
|2015-11-24November 24, 2015
|1964 
|-
|The Astro-Zombies|Michael J. Nelson, Kevin Murphy, and Bill Corbett
|2016-10-11October 11, 2016
|1968
|-
|RiffTrax Live: Time Chasers|Michael J. Nelson, Kevin Murphy, and Bill Corbett
|2016-11-29November 29, 2016
|1994
|-
|RiffTrax Live: MST3K Reunion Show|Michael J. Nelson, Kevin Murphy, and Bill Corbett, with guest riffers Bridget Nelson, Mary Jo Pehl, Trace Beaulieu, Frank Conniff, Jonah Ray, and Joel Hodgson
|2016-11-29November 29, 2016
|Various
|-
|RiffTrax Live: Samurai Cop|Michael J. Nelson, Kevin Murphy, and Bill Corbett
|2017-07-05July 5, 2017
|1991
|-
|RiffTrax Live: Summer Shorts Beach Party|Michael J. Nelson, Kevin Murphy, and Bill Corbett, with guest riffers Bridget Nelson, Mary Jo Pehl, Trace Beaulieu, Frank Conniff, and Paul F. Tompkins
|2017-08-10August 10, 2017
|Various
|-
|Bridget and Mary Jo: Short and Sweet!|Bridget Nelson and Mary Jo Pehl
|2017-11-19November 19, 2017
|Various
|-
|RiffTrax Live: Space Mutiny|Michael J. Nelson, Kevin Murphy, and Bill Corbett
|2018-08-10August 10, 2018
|1988
|-
|The Walking Shorts|Michael J. Nelson, Kevin Murphy, and Bill Corbett 
|2018-10-12October 12, 2018
|Various
|}

Please note that The Incredible 2-Headed Transplant and The Astro-Zombies listed above are not official physical media releases by RiffTrax.  The RiffTrax audio tracks was licensed by Kino Lorber as a special feature for their DVD and Blu-ray releases of the films.

Music

Other downloads

RiffTrax Live! events
The following is a list of Fathom Events's official Rifftrax Live! theatrical showings.

In October and November 2015, RiffTrax had a poll on their website asking users to choose two previous RiffTrax Live shows, up to and including Miami Connection, that they would like to see return to theaters in one night only encore presentations under the title "Best of RiffTrax Live!".  The winners were Starship Troopers, rebroadcast on January 14, 2016 and The Room, rebroadcast on January 28, 2016.

On December 1, 2016, RiffTrax rebroadcast two of their previous RiffTrax Live Christmas shows, Santa Claus Conquers the Martians and Christmas Shorts-stravaganza!, under the title "The RiffTrax Holiday Special Double Feature".  The only new material in this event was a pre-recorded segment featuring Michael J. Nelson, Kevin Murphy, and Bill Corbett riffing on fan-submitted Christmas photos.

See alsoRiffTrax: The Game''

References

External links
Official website
Rifftrax Live at Fathom Events
Official YouTube channel

Mystery Science Theater 3000
Works about films